NGC 5949 is a dwarf spiral galaxy located about 44 million light years away in the constellation of Draco.

References

External links
 

5949
Draco (constellation)
9866
Unbarred spiral galaxies